Longting District is a district of the city of Kaifeng, Henan province, China.In 2005, Jinming District was merged with Longting District.

Administrative divisions
As 2012, this district is divided to 6 subdistricts, 1 town and 4 townships.

References

County-level divisions of Henan